Green Point is an affluent suburb on the Atlantic Seaboard of Cape Town, South Africa located to the north west of the central business district. It is a popular residential area for young professionals and for the Cape Town gay and lesbian community, alongside the gay village of De Waterkant. Many new mid-rise apartment and mixed-use developments have gone up in recent years. Somerset Road forms the main thoroughfare lined by restaurants, cafés, delis, boutiques and nightclubs.

The Braemar Estate includes a few dozen properties that are restricted to single dwellings only, within the boundaries of Green Point 

Between 1980 and 1982, the Green Point constituency was extended to include Walvis Bay, about 1,500km to the north.

Places of Interest 
Skeu Teeth Brothers with the upgrade to Helen Suzman Boulevard and the new Granger Bay Boulevard being constructed, along with a massive investment in creating an urban park around the stadium.

See also 

 Cape Town Stadium
 Green Point Lighthouse, Cape Town
 Green Point Common

References

Suburbs of Cape Town